James Settelmeyer (born March 6, 1971) is an American politician, formerly serving in the Nevada Senate. He represented Churchill, Douglas, Lyon County, and Storey County in Senate District 17.

Early life and education 
Settelmeyer was born in Carson City, a third generation Nevada rancher. His great-grandfather migrated to Gardnerville, Nevada in 1880 from Westphalia, Germany.

Settelmeyer is an agriculturalist and was educated at the California Polytechnic State University. He also took law courses at Concord Law School, but did not earn a degree.

Career 
Settelmeyer was first elected in 2006, and his first session was in 2007 where he was placed on the Commerce and Labor, Governmental Affairs, and Election Procedures & Constitutional Amendments committees. In the Interim James has been appointed to serve on the Senior and Veterans study committee.

Before being an elected representative he was the chairman of the Carson Valley Conservation District, as well as chairman of the Nevada State Conservation Commission.

Settelmeyer was appointed Chairman of District Nine of the Office of the National Ombudsman, Small Business Administration in October 2008. District Nine includes California, Nevada, Arizona, Hawaii and Guam.

He was appointed as natural resources director by the governor.

Personal life 
Settelmeyer lives and works on his family ranch in Douglas County, Nevada. He was married to Sherese from 2002-2021, he filed for divorce in 2020. James and Sherese have one child. He also has an older daughter from a previous relationship.

Notes and references

1971 births
21st-century American politicians
California Polytechnic State University alumni
Living people
People from Minden, Nevada
Politicians from Carson City, Nevada
Republican Party members of the Nevada Assembly
Republican Party Nevada state senators